Ono-i-Lau is a group of islands within a barrier reef system in the Fijian archipelago of Lau Islands (ono means "six" in the Fijian language). There are also three clusters of coral limestone islets, Yanuya (50 islets) and Mana (46 islets) on the barrier reef and Niuta (7 tiny islets). A sand cay, Udui, is not counted as one of the six “islands”.

There are four villages in the group – Nukuni and Lovoni adjacent and Matokana on Onolevu, the largest island, and Doi on Doi.

History 
The group was the location of the first recorded communication between Fijians and Europeans – Captain William Oliver and men of the Matavy, tender to HMS Pandora, in June 1791.

References

External links

Islands of Fiji
Lau Islands